Gilles Müller was the champion in 2008 but did not play this year.
Andrea Stoppini became the new champion, defeating Marsel İlhan in the final 7–6(5), 6–2.

Seeds

Draw

Final four

Top half

Bottom half

References
 Main Draw
 Qualifying Draw

Turk Telecom Izmir Cup - Singles
2009 Türk Telecom İzmir Cup